The Stranger Who Looks Like Me is a 1974 American made-for-television drama romance film directed by Larry Peerce and starring Meredith Baxter, Beau Bridges and Walter Brooke. The cast includes Whitney Blake, who was Meredith Baxter's real-life mother; Bill Vint, who starred in the drive-in classic Macon County Line, as well as future Dallas star Patrick Duffy, who has a small part. The film originally premiered as the ABC Movie of the Week on March 6, 1974.

Plot
Joanne Denver was adopted at birth and is searching for her birth parents. She meets Chris Schroeder, who is also adopted and is searching for his birth parents.

Cast
 Meredith Baxter as Joanne Denver
 Beau Bridges as Chris Schroeder
 Walter Brooke as Mr. Denver
 Neva Patterson as Mrs. Denver
 Whitney Blake as Emma Verko
 Woody Chambliss as Paul (as Woodrow Chambliss)
 Ford Rainey as Mr. Gilbert 
 Maxine Stuart as Mrs. Weiner
 Patricia Harty as Carol Sutton
 Mary Murphy as Mrs. Quayle
 Bill Vint as Bob
 Anne Barton as Mrs. Carter
 Warren Miller as Mike Sutton
 Linda Morrow as Gloria 
 Victor Bevine as Gary 
 Cecil Elliott as Gramma Dupre (as Cecil Elliot)
 Jan Arvan as Uncle Charles 
 Biff Elliot as Charles Verko (as Biff Elliott)
 Tom Moses as Clerk 
 Sylvia Walden as Adoptive Parent #1
 Millie Slavin as Adoptive Parent #2
 Hampton Fancher as Adoptive Parent #3
 Jocelyn Jones as Adoptee #1
 Susan Adams as Adoptee #2
 Patrick Duffy as Adoptee #3
 Warren Seabury as Adoptee #4

References

External links
 

1974 television films
1974 films
1974 drama films
American drama films
ABC Movie of the Week
Films directed by Larry Peerce
1970s English-language films
1970s American films